José Romero Santos (born 26 January 1936) is a Cuban rower. He competed in the men's coxed four event at the 1956 Summer Olympics.

References

1936 births
Living people
Cuban male rowers
Olympic rowers of Cuba
Rowers at the 1956 Summer Olympics
Place of birth missing (living people)